Park Byung-ro (born 21 July 1962) is a South Korean alpine skier. He competed in three events at the 1984 Winter Olympics.

References

1962 births
Living people
South Korean male alpine skiers
Olympic alpine skiers of South Korea
Alpine skiers at the 1984 Winter Olympics
Place of birth missing (living people)
20th-century South Korean people